Glamis may refer to:

Glamis, a village in Scotland
Glamis, California, a train crossing site in southern California near the Algodones Dunes
Glamis Castle
Glamis Gold, former gold producer company from US